Francis Jones was an American politician who represented Tennessee in the United States House of Representatives.

Biography
Jones was born in Tennessee and his birth date is unknown. Although he received a limited schooling; he studied law, and was admitted to bar.

Career
Jones began his practice in Winchester, Tennessee. David Crockett tells in his autobiography about the strong feelings that brought him to volunteer.  According to Crockett's book, a young local lawyer named Francis Jones made a fiery speech, then volunteered and was elected captain, and later represented the district in Congress.  During the Creek War, Jones had his own company of Tennessee Volunteer Mounted Riflemen.

Jones was elected Solicitor General of the third Tennessee district in 1815.

Jones was elected as a Democratic-Republican to the Fifteenth, Sixteenth, and Seventeenth Congresses.  He served from March 4, 1817 to March 3, 1823,  then resumed the practice of his profession in Winchester.

Death
Jones died on an unknown date in Winchester, Franklin County, Tennessee. The place of his interment is unknown.

References

External links

18th-century births
Democratic-Republican Party members of the United States House of Representatives from Tennessee
Year of death unknown